Cotoneaster divaricatus, the spreading cotoneaster, is a species of flowering plant in the family Rosaceae. It is native to China, and has been introduced to Ontario in Canada, the Midwest United States, northern and central Europe, Kenya, and the South Island of New Zealand. The Centre for Agriculture and Bioscience International lists it in its Invasive Species Compendium.

References

divaricatus
Endemic flora of China
Flora of Tibet
Flora of Xinjiang
Flora of North-Central China
Flora of South-Central China
Flora of Southeast China
Plants described in 1912